Patrick James Kennedy (1864 – 10 March 1947) was an Irish nationalist politician and Member of Parliament (MP) in the House of Commons of the United Kingdom of Great Britain and Ireland.

He was elected as an Irish National Federation (Anti-Parnellite) MP for the North Kildare constituency at the 1892 general election, and did not contest the 1895 general election.

He was elected as a Healyite Nationalist MP at the 1900 general election for the North Westmeath constituency. He joined the Irish Parliamentary Party during the parliamentary term, but did not contest the 1906 general election.

External links

 

1864 births
1947 deaths
Anti-Parnellite MPs
Healyite Nationalist MPs
Irish Parliamentary Party MPs
Members of the Parliament of the United Kingdom for County Kildare constituencies (1801–1922)
Members of the Parliament of the United Kingdom for County Westmeath constituencies (1801–1922)
UK MPs 1892–1895
UK MPs 1900–1906